Turn the Page is an album by the American zydeco musician Chris Ardoin, released in 1998. His band, Double Clutchin'—which included his brother, Sean—is also credited. Ardoin was still a teenager when the album was recorded.

Production
The album was produced by Scott Billington. "Barres De La Prison" is a cover of the Canray Fontenot composition.

Critical reception

The Village Voice called the album "excellent," writing that "Fever for Your Flavor" is "powered by psychedelic space electronics and grown-up red-clay soul vocals that welcome zydeco to the urban jungle, blackboard jungle, and rubyfruit jungle simultaneously." The Boston Globe considered Ardoin "perhaps the nimblest accordionist now playing zydeco," and wrote that he "keeps his meanderings melodic, his solos (on both diatonic and triple-row accordions) intricate and playful."

The Orlando Sentinel noted that the band "strikes out for more experimental territory on the penultimate cut, 'Fever for Your Flavor', which employs some hip-hop rhythms in a spare, dub-influenced setting; Chris keeps the track grounded with a sneaky little riff that sounds a bit like the Pink Panther theme turned sideways." The Daily Herald deemed the album a mix of "soul, R&B and fast-cooking Zydeco rhythms." The Wall Street Journal concluded that Turn the Page "offers a choice sampling of today's crisp and energetic zydeco sound, which layers rich R&B-style vocal harmonies and Caribbean ska and reggae grooves over blues-drenched accordion playing."

AllMusic wrote that Ardoin and his band "continue to be the most forward-looking of the young zydeco bands coming up ... When they talk about zydeco being irresistible dance music, this is what they're talking about." OffBeat listed Turn the Page as the best album of 1998.

Track listing

References

1998 albums
Rounder Records albums
Zydeco albums